Baba Canton is a canton of Ecuador, located in the Los Ríos Province.  Its capital is the town of Baba.  Its population at the 2001 census was 35,185.

Demographics
Ethnic groups as of the Ecuadorian census of 2010:
Montubio  66.9%
Mestizo  26.8%
Afro-Ecuadorian  4.1%
White  1.8%
Indigenous  0.3%
Other  0.1%

References

Cantons of Los Ríos Province